Jacobo Kyushei Gorobioye Tomonaga de Santa María, OP (Yakobo de Santa Maria Tomonaga Gorōbyōe; c. 1582 – August 17, 1633) was a Japanese Dominican priest. He composed one of the first modern Japanese dictionaries. He was martyred in 1633.

Life
Jacobo Kyushei Gorobioye Tomonaga was born of a noble Christian family in Kuidetsu (part of modern Ōmura, Nagasaki), Japan. In his youth, he studied with the Jesuits and became a catechist. After 1614, he came to Manila and became a Franciscan tertiary. He then sought admission to the Dominican Order and was accepted. He was ordained a priest in 1626 and sent to the island of Formosa (Taiwan). He returned to Manila in 1630.

He returned to Japan in 1632 as a missionary. He served to spread Catholicism during the period of Christians persecution.

After returning to Japan he spent very difficult years of hunger, his life was at risk and he was continually in hiding. In July 1633 his hiding place was uncovered by the authorities with the help of the traitor Matthew Kohioye, who was his own catechist, he was caught and put into prison. There he was tortured by gallows and thrown into a pit on 15 August 1633. In two days he was dead. His body was not buried but burnt and thrown into the sea.

Jacobo Kyushei Tomonaga was declared Venerable on 11 October 1980 by Pope John Paul II (decree of martyrdom), who later beatified him on 18 February 1981 in Manila, Philippines  and canonized him on 18 October 1987 in St. Peter's Basilica, Vatican City.

References

Sources
Lorenzo de Manila, The Proto-Martyr of The Philippines and his Companions - Fr. Fidel Villaroel, O.P., 1988

1580s births
1633 deaths
Japanese Roman Catholic saints
Members of the Dominican Order
Japanese Roman Catholics
17th-century Christian saints
Beatifications by Pope John Paul II
Canonizations by Pope John Paul II
17th-century Roman Catholic martyrs